La bohème is an Italian opera in four acts, with music and libretto by Ruggero Leoncavallo, based on Scènes de la vie de bohème (1851) by Henri Murger. The opera received a successful premiere at the Teatro la Fenice, Venice on 6 May 1897.

Leoncavallo wrote his opera La bohème contemporaneously with Giacomo Puccini's own treatment of the same story. Leoncavallo later revised the work, titling it Mimì Pinson, but despite initial respect, it did not survive. Puccini's version has become a standard in the operatic repertoire, whereas Leoncavallo's opera is rarely performed. Leoncavallo's version did not receive its UK premiere until May 1970.

Allan Atlas has analysed in detail the different treatments of the death of the Mimì character in both Leoncavallo's and Puccini's versions of La bohème, contrasting the historical success of Puccini's opera and the relative failure of Leoncavallo's.

Roles
{| class="wikitable"
!Role
!Voice type
!Premiere Cast, 6 May 1897(Conductor: Alessandro Pomè)
|-
|Schaunard, a musician
|baritone
|Jacques [Gianni] Isnardon
|-
|Marcello, a painter
|tenor
|Giovanni Beduschi
|-
|Rodolfo, a poet |baritone
|Rodolfo Angelini-Fornari
|-
|Mimì
|soprano
|Rosina Storchio
|-
|Musetta
|mezzo-soprano
|Elisa "Lison" Frandin
|-
|Gaudenzio
|tenor
|Enrico Giordani
|-
|Loafer
|tenor
|
|-
|Colline, a philosopher |bass
|Lucio Aristi
|-
|Eufemia
|mezzo-soprano
|Clelia Cappelli
|-
|Barbemuche
|bass
|Giuseppe Frigiotti
|-
|Durand
|tenor
|Enrico Giordani
|-
|colspan="3"|Students, working girls, townsfolk, shopkeepers, street-vendors, soldiers, waiters, women and children - chorus|}

 Synopsis 

Place: Paris.
Time: one year from Christmas, 1837 to Christmas, 1838.

Act 1Café MomusThe innkeeper Gaudenzio tries in vain to eject the Bohemians, who never pay and are continually up to no good. During the conversation another piece of horseplay on their part is discovered. They sit down to dine, while Musette gaily sings. (Canzonette: "Mimì is the name of my sweet blonde.") Naturally when they are asked to pay the bill, they have no money. A comic fight ensues between them and the innkeeper, who has called his servants to assist him. It is ended by Barbemuche, who offers to pay the bill.

Act 2The courtyard of Musette's houseMusette's lover has left her, refusing any longer to pay her debts. In consequence, her furniture has been confiscated and is carried down to the courtyard. When this has been done, she returns home. She expects guests but cannot entertain them in any other way than by receiving them in the courtyard. Here the Bohemians, who arrive in large numbers, celebrate joyously. The neighbours, awakened from sleep, protest in vain and the scene ends in a general fight between the two factions.

Act 3Marcello's garret roomMusette, who can no longer bear the sufferings of hunger and want, determines to leave Marcello. During the festivities in the courtyard, Mimì has allowed herself to be carried off by Count Paul, but she returns, motivated by love for Rodolfo. Musette begs her to go with her, but she refuses. Angrily, Marcello and Rodolfo force both women to leave the apartment.

Act 4Rodolfo's garret roomMimì returns to Rodolfo, at the brink of death. Musette, who accidentally meets her there, sacrifices her jewels to procure fuel to warm the room for Mimì. As the Christmas chimes are heard, Mimì dies.

Noted arias
 "Musette!...Testa adorata" (Marcello)
 "Io non ho che una povera stanzetta" (Marcello)
 "Musette svaria sulla bocca viva" (Mimì)
 "Da quel suon soavemente" (Musette)
 "Scuoti, o vento fra i sibili" (Rodolfo)

Recordings

References
Notes

Sources
Holden, Amanda, ed., The New Penguin Opera Guide, New York: Penguin Puttnam, Inc, 2001
 Melitz, Leo, The Opera Goer's Complete Guide'', 1921 version as source for the synopsis
 Operadis Opera Discography, as of 4/30/2014

Fiction set in 1837
Fiction set in 1838
Operas by Ruggero Leoncavallo
Italian-language operas
Verismo operas
Operas set in Paris
1897 operas
Operas
Opera world premieres at La Fenice
Operas based on Scenes of Bohemian Life